The Fédération des Entreprises Romandes Genève (FER Genève) is a Swiss (Romand designates Swiss cantons where people speak French) employer's organization based in Geneva, Switzerland. It groups 28,000 members, including multinational corporations as well as 9,000 independent workers and 80 trade associations. It is involved in negotiations with the trade unions, political lobbying and the provision of services and business networking opportunities for its members.

The FER Genève operates two institutions active in the Swiss pension system: CIAM-AVS (active in the first pillar of the system) and the CIEPP (active in the second pillar).

Management 
Blaise Matthey is the Director and Ivan Slatkine the President.

References

Sources
Pierre Cormon, Histoire de la FER Genève, Editions de la Fédération des Entreprises Romande Genève, 2018,

External links
 Official site of the FER Genève
 Website of the CIAM-AVS
 Website of the CIEPP

Employers' organizations
Economy of Geneva
Organisations based in Geneva